Charles Jawanzaa Worth (born October 20, 1986), known by his stage names King Chip and Chip tha Ripper, is an American rapper from Cleveland, Ohio. He is notable for amassing several self-released mixtapes, as well as for his work with longtime associate and fellow Cleveland rapper Kid Cudi.

Musical career

2006–2011
Worth began releasing music on hip-hop blogs and mixtapes in 2006. Much of Worth's recent work has been performed with rapper Kid Cudi, also from Ohio. Worth's musical style has been described as a slow, chopped and screwed, southern hip hop. One of his biggest songs that shook the city of Cleveland, is "Catch The Beat", featured on his Money Mixtape. This track is one of the many, that introduced him to the industry. 

In 2007, the song "Club Rockin", from his Money mixtape, featured Akon singing chorus. Worth remained an independent musician, and did not sign with a production company.  In 2008, Worth frequently visited Chicago, where he eventually performed with Kidz in the Hall on their album The In Crowd, on which Worth performed the song "Mr. Alldatshit".  In late 2009, Chip released a mixtape entitled The Cleveland Show, named after the animated sitcom of the same name. The single, "Fat Raps", features Big Sean and Currensy, and is produced by Chuck Inglish.

On September 5, 2010, Chip Tha Ripper announced plans to form the musical duo "The Almighty GloryUS" with Kid Cudi, with whom he shared a mutual appreciation.

Worth was featured on producer Hi-Tek's album Hi-Teknology 3 in 2007, and on Kid Cudi's first mixtape A Kid Named Cudi in 2008.  In 2009, Worth was featured on Kid Cudi's first album Man on the Moon: The End of Day, which peaked at No. 3 on the Billboard Hot 100.  Worth performed with Kidz in the Hall again in 2010, on their Land of Make Believe album.  Also in 2010, Worth performed the song "The End" on Kid Cudi's second album Man on the Moon II: The Legend of Mr. Rager. On February 18, 2011, Worth, Freddie Gibbs, and The Cool Kids formed the hip hop supergroup "P.O.C.", an acronym for "pulled over by the cops".

2012–present
On August 9, 2012, Worth changed his stage name from "Chip tha Ripper" to "King Chip". He also said that he had signed a contract with Creative Artists Agency.  Regarding his changed stage name, King Chip tweeted:I am King Chip. Actually born in the ghetto slums of East Cleveland, Ohio. Rest in peace my mentor and former king, Hawk. His death made me....My birth name is Charles Jawanzaa Worth. Jawanzaa is Swahili and it means 'great leader and great warrior.' Look it up. I am King Chip.

King Chip performed on Kid Cudi's single "Just What I Am", taken from Cudi's third studio album Indicud (2013). On September 4, 2013, King Chip released the mixtape 44108. On December 26, 2013, King Chip released a music video for a song titled "Action Plan", from his 44108 mixtape.  His next project was to be titled Rebel Castles. On September 16, 2014, a deluxe edition of 44108 was released to digital retailers through King Chip's "Rebel Castles" imprint.

In 2019, King Chip started referring to himself as Chip tha Ripper again on recent singles.

In early 2020, an old 2007 freestyle from Chip's visit to Street Starz TV Radio resurfaced and became a TikTok sensation gaining over 70 million views. In the same year Chip teamed up with New Zealand rapper Lil Mussie to take part in his charity EP helping kids in poverty.

Interior Crocodile Alligator

In 2007, Worth appeared on PrettyBoy Floyd's show, "Street Stars' Radio", and performed a freestyle song to the beat of Ali & Gipp's "Go 'Head". It became known as the "S.L.A.B. Freestyle" (after his own label), but it has, in recent years, come to be known more commonly as the "Interior Crocodile Alligator" song (or rap), after the iconic final two lines:

"Interior crocodile alligator / I drive a Chevrolet movie theater."

This snippet of the freestyle became very popular on the internet, especially for usage in memes.

Discography

 Gift Raps (2011)
 CleveLAfornia (2015)
 Bonfire with Lex Luger  (2022)

Concert tours 
Headlining

Supporting
The Cud Life Tour  (2011)

References

External links
 

1986 births
Living people
African-American male rappers
Rappers from Cleveland
Underground rappers
Songwriters from Ohio
Midwest hip hop musicians
21st-century American rappers
21st-century American male musicians
21st-century African-American musicians
20th-century African-American people
Indie rappers
African-American male songwriters